Binnenstad (Dutch, 'Inner city') may refer to the following places in the Netherlands:

 Binnenstad (Amsterdam)
 Binnenstad (Maastricht)
 Binnenstad (tram stop) in Utrecht

See also
 Inner city
 City centre